Dragoslav Jakovljević (4 May 1932 – 6 March 2012) was a Serbian boxer. He competed in the men's light middleweight event at the 1960 Summer Olympics.

References

1932 births
2012 deaths
Yugoslav male boxers
Serbian male boxers
Olympic boxers of Yugoslavia
Boxers at the 1960 Summer Olympics
Sportspeople from Kragujevac
Light-middleweight boxers